The Mint Julep Stakes is a Grade III American Thoroughbred horse race for fillies and mares, four years old and older over a distance of one and one sixteenth miles on the turf scheduled annually in late May or early June at Churchill Downs in Louisville, Kentucky.  It currently offers a purse of $200,000.

History
From its inaugural running in 1977 to 1986, the event was run on the dirt course, but was moved to the turf course beginning in 1987.

The race is named for the Mint Julep, a popular drink with racing fans at Churchill Downs, particularly seen on Kentucky Derby day.

The event was split into divisions in 1987 and 1990.

Between 1983 and 2004 the conditions of the event were for fillies and mares that were four year olds and older.

In 2001 the event was upgraded to a Grade III.

From 2001 to 2014 the event was known as the Early Time Mint Julep Handicap. Beginning in 2015, the Mint Julep Handicap became the Old Forester Mint Julep Handicap for sponsorship reasons.

Distances
It has been run at the following distances:

  miles (1.71 km) : 1990–present
  miles (1.81 km) : 1988–1989
 1 mile (1.61 km) : 1983–1987
 7 furlongs (1.41 km) : 1977–1982

Records
Speed record
 miles – 1:40.70  Quite A Bride (2007) 

Margins 
 5 lengths – Lillian Russell  (1981) 

Most wins
 2 – Megans Bluff (2001, 2002)

Most wins by an owner
 2 – Carl F. Pollard (2003, 2015)
 2 – James C. Routsong (2001, 2002)
 2 – Richard and Bertram Klein (2013, 2016)
 2 – Madaket Stables (2020, 2021)

Most wins by a jockey
 4 – Robby Albarado (1997, 2005, 2006, 2007)

Most wins by a trainer
 5 – William I. Mott (1987, 1996, 2005, 2006, 2007)

Winners

Legend:

 
 

Notes:

† In 1997, Romy won but was disqualified for interference in the stretch and set back to fourth.

References

Graded stakes races in the United States
Mile category horse races for fillies and mares
Turf races in the United States
Recurring sporting events established in 1977
Churchill Downs horse races
1977 establishments in Kentucky
Grade 3 stakes races in the United States